Van Etten is a surname. Notable people with the surname include:
 Chris Van Etten, American television writer
 Hudson Van Etten (1874–1941), United States Navy sailor
 Jane Van Etten (born 1871), American composer
 Sharon Van Etten (born 1981), American singer-songwriter

Other 
 Van Etten, New York, a town in Chemung County, New York, United States
 Van Etten (hamlet), New York, former village within Van Etten, New York
 Vanetten House,  historic house in Little Rock, Arkansas, United States
 Van Etten Lake, lake in Iosco County, Michigan, United States

See also 
 Van Atta
 Van Natta

Dutch-language surnames
Surnames of Dutch origin